The State Archival Service of Ukraine or Ukrderzharkhiv is a Ukrainian government agency that implements state policy regarding the keeping of archives and record, function of state system of documentation security fund as well as an inter-trade coordination on matters within its competence. In 2010, the service was reorganised based on the State Committee of Archives (DerzhKomArchiv). The agency is part of the Ministry of Justice of Ukraine since 1999. Between 1947 and 1960, it belonged to the NKVD.

Ukrderzharkhiv has been a member of the International Council on Archives since 1956.

Description
Ukrainian archives are among the least accessible in Europe, as archives do not publish their catalogs online, and there is no state program for this as of 2017. Archives are often overloaded with visitors. Waiting time to access documents in reading room could reach several weeks and occasionally months. Most of the staff speak Ukrainian or Russian only. Some of the Western archives have personnel that can speak Polish and occasionally Romanian, Moldavian and English. So far it seems that the State Archives of Odesa Oblast is the only one where personnel can speak English.

Over the years there have been some international programs for scanning collections. The United States Holocaust Memorial Museum had some successful programs.

FamilySearch used to work in Ukraine from 1993 to 2011, however the contract was dropped by the Government of Ukraine when president Viktor Yanukovych came to power. His new chief of Ukrderzharkhiv and a member of the Communist Party of Ukraine, Olha Hinzburh, proclaimed that "Ukrainian archives are to open for everyone". During 18 years of successful collaboration FamilySearch digitised many collections and made them available online. Due to their agreement with the Government of Ukraine, these records (unlike similar records from other areas) are only available in person at a Family History Center. FamilySearch has tried to get permission to make the records available online, but efforts have been refused by the Ukrderzharkhiv.

In general, Ukrainian archives struggle of poor state support and strong corruption. Putting documents online will drop illegal income for many archives officials and so they block it.

In 2003, Ukraine had lost one of the most valuable collections of Ukrainian Podilia 1795–1900 during the fire in Kamianets-Podilskyi archive. In 2014, Ukraine lost the Crimea, Donestk and Luhansk archives.

Most of the present archives stored in old buildings without fundamental storage facilities. Some of the buildings do not even have heating in winter.

There were a number of rumors about stealing precious documents from state archives. Some of them were available on international auctions like eBay. Most notable cases were in Lviv and Kharkiv archives. It is not clear of how many documents were stolen and absent at the moment.

Previous names
 1921–1923: Main Archive Administration of the People's Commissariat of Education of the Ukrainian SSR
 1923–1938: Central Archive Administration (Central Executive Committee of Ukraine)
 1938–1939: under direct jurisdiction of the Main Archive Administration of the People's Commissariat of Internal Affairs of the Soviet Union
 1939–1941: Archive department of the People's Commissariat of Internal Affairs of the Ukrainian SSR
 1941–1941: Archive Administration of the People's Commissariat of Internal Affairs of the Ukrainian SSR
 1941–1947: Administration of State Archives of the People's Commissariat of Internal Affairs of the Ukrainian SSR
 1941–1943: evacuation to the city of Zlatoust
 1947–1960: Administration of State Archives of the Ministry of Internal Affairs of the Ukrainian SSR
 1960–1974: Archive Administration of the Council of Ministers of the Ukrainian SSR
 1974–1992: Main Archive Administration of the Council of Ministers of the Ukrainian SSR
 1992–1999: Main Archive Administration of the Cabinet of Ministers of Ukraine
 1999–1999: Main Archive Administration of Ukraine
 1999–2010: 
 2010–present: State Archival Service of Ukraine

Heads
 1948–1969: 
 1969–1988: 
 1988–1996: 
 1996–1998: N. Kystruska
 1998–2002: Ruslan Pyrih
 2002–2006: 
 2006–2008: 
 2008–2009: 
 2009–2014: Olha Hinzburh
 2014–2019: Tetyana Baranova
 2019–present:

See also
 List of archives in Ukraine
 List of national archives

References

External links
  (archived version)
 Member profile at International Council on Archives website

 
1919 establishments in Ukraine
Archives in Ukraine
Government agencies established in 1919
Government agencies of Ukraine
Ukraine
Ukrainian Ministry of Justice agencies